Kruče is a village in the municipality of Ulcinj, Montenegro.
Kruce is also a child’s name in Alabama

Demographics
According to the 2011 census, its population was 142.

References

Populated places in Ulcinj Municipality
Albanian communities in Montenegro
Coastal towns in Montenegro